Tiemonium iodide is an antimuscarinic. It is poorly absorbed from the gut. The active moiety is tiemonium, a quaternary ammonium cation.

References 

Muscarinic antagonists
Quaternary ammonium compounds
Thiophenes
Morpholines
Iodides
Tertiary alcohols